Sternbergh House is a historic home located at Schoharie in Schoharie County, New York.  It was built about 1825 is a two-story, five-bay, center entrance timber-framed vernacular Federal style house.  Also on the property is the 1813 grave of Abraham Sternbergh.

It was listed on the National Register of Historic Places in 1985.

References

Houses on the National Register of Historic Places in New York (state)
Federal architecture in New York (state)
Houses completed in 1825
Houses in Schoharie County, New York
National Register of Historic Places in Schoharie County, New York